"Such a Wicked Love" is a song by American singer La Toya Jackson from her fifth album La Toya. A remix, produced by hip-hop production team Full Force, was released on a 12" single in the U.S. The album track "Does It Really Matter" was included as a B-side.

To promote the single, Jackson set up a hotline where fans could phone in to hear the song. Jackson's hotline, an early form of podcasting, reached 20,000 listeners per day.

Jackson debuted "Such a Wicked Love" on "Bob Hope's Easter Vacation in the Bahamas", screened on March 25, 1989. Broadcaster NBC's Standards and Practices department censored Jackson's performance, deeming her dance moves "too prurient" for prime time television.

Jackson performed the song in Puerto Vallarta for Mexican television and in Caracas for the Venezuelan television program "Only For Men" in March 1989. The number was also part of her September 1989 Sizzling Spectacular concert on pay-per-view at Bally's Reno.

Versions
 "Such A Wicked Love" Album version – 5:33
 "Such A Wicked Love" Single version
 "Such A Wicked Love" 7" version – 4:16
 "Such A Wicked Love" (F.F. Remix)  5:32
 "Such A Wicked Love" (Full Force Remix Instrumental) 5:32

References

1989 singles
La Toya Jackson songs
1988 songs
RCA Records singles
Song recordings produced by Full Force